The 2013 Guadiana Trophy was the 13th edition of the competition and took place between 5 and 7 August 2013. It featured Sporting CP, West Ham United and Braga. 

Braga won its first Guadiana Trophy by winning both of its matches in the competition by a score of 1–0.

Standings

Matches

Day 1

Day 2

Day 3

2013–14
2013–14 in Portuguese football
2013–14 in English football